Cristian Volpato (born 15 November 2003) is an Italian professional footballer who plays as attacking midfielder for  club Roma. Born in Australia, Volpato has represented Italy internationally at youth level since 2022.

Early life 
Volpato was born in Camperdown, an inner western suburb of Sydney in Australia.

Club career

Youth career 
Volpato first started playing football in Abbotsford, still in Sydney suburbs, where he was a very prolific goalscorer.

This allowed him to take his first steps into professional football, at Andrea Icardi's AC Milan Soccer School, Sydney FC and the Western Sydney Wanderers academy. He soon earned a trial in the AS Roma Youth Sector through Fabrizio Piccareta.

After a few months in Rome where he was able to demonstrate his attacking abilities, the young footballer signed a three-year-contract with the club from the Italian capital in January 2020. A month later he also joined Francesco Totti's agency, whilst he had already taken the number 10 shirt with Roma's Youth.

A year later, Volpato signed his first professional contract with Roma, a new three-year-deal tying him to the club until 2024. As the youth competitions due to the COVID-19 pandemic in Italy, he then became a regular with the under-18, scoring five goals during the 2020–21 season, soon earning a place in the under-19s squad.

Roma 
Volpato made his professional debut for Roma on 4 December 2021, aged 18, in a Serie A match lost 3–0 against Inter Milan. On 19 February 2022, Volpato scored his first Serie A goal in a match drawn 2–2 against Hellas Verona.

In the following season, after making his debut in the UEFA Europa League with Roma, he made his first league appearance on 31 October 2022, coming on as a substitute for Nicolò Zaniolo at the 57th minute of the match against Hellas Verona. In the occasion, he scored a goal and assisted Stephan El Shaarawy for another one, thus helping Roma obtain a 3–1 win.

International career 
Volpato is eligible to represent either Australia or Italy internationally.

He took part in the 2022 UEFA European Under-19 Championship with Italy U19, scoring two goals in the tournament.

On 12 December 2021, it was reported that Australia national team manager Graham Arnold was considering calling up Volpato for the upcoming 2022 FIFA World Cup qualifiers against Vietnam and Oman. He was also called up to the Australia U23 side; however, he was withdrawn from the squad by Roma. In March 2022, following Australia's 2–0 loss to Japan, Volpato posted an image on his Snapchat story poking fun at the team. This led to many fans labeling him as "childish" and "immature". With Australia announcing their World Cup squad on 8 November, Graham Arnold disclosed that Volpato had been offered a spot in the 26 man squad, but declined the opportunity.

On 19 November 2022, he made his debut for the Italy U21 squad in a friendly match lost 4-2 against Germany.

Style of play 
Volpato is able to play both as a trequartista or a winger. Seen as a regista or deep-lying playmaker in his early career, he is often compared to Totti, his model as a number 10 and his direct mentor in his first year at Roma.

Career statistics

References

External links
 
 AS Roma profile
 National Premier Leagues U13-15 and U16 profiles

2003 births
Living people
People from the Inner West (Sydney)
Italian footballers
Italy youth international footballers
Australian soccer players
Australian people of Italian descent
Sportspeople of Italian descent
Association football forwards
Sydney United 58 FC players
Sydney FC players
Western Sydney Wanderers FC players
A.S. Roma players
Serie A players